Xietaizi  is a station on Line 1 of Chongqing Rail Transit in Chongqing Municipality, China. It is located in Jiulongpo District. It opened in 2011.

Line 5 and Line 18, which are both currently under construction, will also serve the station in future.

Station structure

References

Jiulongpo District
Railway stations in China opened in 2011
Chongqing Rail Transit stations